The Vermont Psychiatric Care Hospital is the State of Vermont's primary hospital for involuntary mental health patients. It is located in the town of Berlin, Vermont, in Washington County. With 25 beds, it was opened in 2014 as a replacement for the Vermont State Hospital, which had been closed due to flooding from Tropical Storm Irene.

The hospital was designed and constructed by local firms at a cost of $23 million.

References

Buildings and structures in Berlin, Vermont
Psychiatric hospitals in Vermont
2014 establishments in Vermont
Hospitals established in 2014